Fullers  Bridge, officially called the Fullers Creek Bridge, is a road bridge that carries Delhi Road to Millwood Avenue across the Lane Cove River, in , Sydney, New South Wales, Australia.

The main entrance to Lane Cove National Park is located adjacent to the western end of Fullers Bridge.

Description
Completed in 1918, Fullers Bridge is a six-span structure, with four longitudinal deck beams on an over-vertical curve or camber. The beams have soffits which are parallel with the deck over most of their length, but curve down to the piers. The piers consist of two columns each supported by timber piles with pilecaps. The pier columns have a square core cross section with large chamfers, giving an octagonal appearance, with four tapered thickenings or buttresses. The deep headstock connecting the columns supports the four deck beams. The deck is continuous from one abutment to the other. On the upstream side of the deck a timber walkway has been installed, supported by steel cantilever beams connected under the edge of the deck. The original pipe handrails have been replaced by guardrailing. The bridge also supports utility pipes on its downstream side.

History
Fullers Bridge is named after the Fuller family which operated a farm on the small area of agriculturally usable land which existed on the river banks at that location, in the late 19th century.

Up until the early 1980s a kiosk and general store existed on the northern side of the bridge, and was accessible from both sides of the river by the northern pedestrian footbridge.

Heritage significance

See also

 List of bridges in Sydney

References

External links

 

Bridges in Sydney
1918 establishments in Australia
Beam bridges
Concrete bridges in Australia
Bridges completed in 1918
Chatswood West, New South Wales
Road bridges in New South Wales